Ladybugs is a 1992 American sports-comedy film starring Rodney Dangerfield and directed by Sidney J. Furie. Dangerfield plays a Denver businessman who takes over a girls soccer team that the company he works for sponsors. The film also stars Jackée Harry as his assistant coach, Ilene Graff as his girlfriend, Jonathan Brandis as his girlfriend's son, and Vinessa Shaw as his boss' daughter.

Then Los Angeles Dodgers manager Tommy Lasorda has a cameo, as do Blake Clark and longtime Dangerfield friend Chuck McCann.

Plot 
Chester Lee (Rodney Dangerfield) is desperate for a promotion at work and some respect from his boss. To impress his boss, he claims to have been a good soccer player in his youth and is badgered into coaching a girls' team called the Ladybugs. Dragging his assistant Julie (Jackée Harry) along as assistant coach, Chester figures the gig easy as the Ladybugs, sponsored by his company, are a dynasty, having dominated previous seasons. If he can get this team to a championship, he will get the promotion. Unfortunately, only one player has returned for the new season. The new team, which includes the boss' daughter, Kimberly (Vinessa Shaw), are clueless, make a dreadful start to the season and the boss is less than impressed.

In his personal life, Chester is engaged to Bess (Ilene Graff), who has a son, Matthew (Jonathan Brandis), from a previous marriage. Matthew just happens to be a great athlete, but poor grades get him kicked off the soccer team. Chester invites Matthew to watch the Ladybugs practice and to get some tips. Matthew has a crush on Kimberly from school, which partly inspires Chester to persuade him to dress like a girl and play for the team as "Martha". With only Chester, Matthew and Julie knowing Martha's secret identity, the team rallies through the season to reach the championship game. Kimberly befriends Martha, not knowing "she" is in fact Matthew.

Just before the championship game, Bess finds out that Matthew has been dressing as a girl to play. Furious with Chester, she forces him to drop Matthew from the team. Kimberly, who has not been playing well, is also dropped at the request of Chester's boss.

The Ladybugs trail 3-0 in the first half. At halftime, Matthew reveals his true identity to Kimberly and the rest of his teammates. His honesty fires the team up and with Chester's encouragement, Kimberly scores the winning goal on a penalty kick. As the Ladybugs win the championship, Chester gets his promotion. Bess and Chester get married while Matthew and Kimberly begin dating.  Chester is now managing the company's girls softball team, where the entire team are boys dressed as girls. After his boss congratulates him on his success, Chester says to the audience, "I finally got some respect!"

Cast
 Rodney Dangerfield as Coach Chester Lee
 Jackée Harry as Julie Benson 
 Jonathan Brandis as Matthew/Martha
 Ilene Graff as Bess
 Vinessa Shaw as Kimberly Mullen
 Tom Parks as Dave Mullen
 Randall May as Championship Soccer trainer
 Jeanetta Arnette as Glynnis Mullen
 Crystal Cooke as Nancy Larimer (as LaCrystal Cooke)
 Jennifer Frances Lee as Carmelita Chu
 Vanessa Monique Rossel as Tina Velez
 Johna Stewart-Bowden as Sally Anne Welfelt (as Johna Stewart)
 Jandi Swanson as Penny Pester
 Nancy Parsons as Coach Annie
 Blake Clark as Coach Bull
 Tommy Lasorda as Coach Cannoli

Production
Shooting took place from July through September 1991 in and around Denver, Colorado.

Release
Paramount struggled with how to market the film and considered changing the title, as it clashed with Dangerfield's image as a profane comic.  The film grossed almost US$15 million in the US and Canada, while Warner Bros. and Morgan Creek International obtained the foreign distribution rights.

Reception
Ladybugs was panned by critics. On Rotten Tomatoes holds an approval rating of 12% with an average rating of 3.69/10, based on 17 reviews. Audiences however polled by CinemaScore gave the film an average grade of "A−" on an A+ to F scale.

Michael Wilmington of the Los Angeles Times wrote that the film flip-flops on its themes and "has the stale, slick, worked-over look of standard studio product". Vincent Canby of The New York Times wrote: "Even when the material is feeble, as it is here, Mr. Dangerfield can sometimes be funny."

References

External links
 
 
 
 
 
 Ladybugs at the Sports Movie Guide

1992 films
1992 comedy films
1990s sports comedy films
American association football films
American sports comedy films
Cross-dressing in American films
Films directed by Sidney J. Furie
Films scored by Richard Gibbs
Films set in Colorado
Films shot in Colorado
Paramount Pictures films
Warner Bros. films
1990s English-language films
1990s American films